Unibank CJSC  is an Armenian universal bank offering retail banking services and is headquartered in Yerevan, Armenia.

See also

Economy of Armenia
List of banks
List of banks in Armenia

References

External links
 Official website

Banks of Armenia
Banks established in 2001